Nymphargus ignotus is a species of frog in the family Centrolenidae, formerly placed in Cochranella.
It is endemic to Colombia.
Its natural habitats are subtropical or tropical moist montane forests and rivers.

References

ignotus
Amphibians of Colombia
Amphibians described in 1990
Taxonomy articles created by Polbot